The Regional Transportation Authority (RTA) is the financial and oversight body for the three transit agencies in northeastern Illinois; the Chicago Transit Authority (CTA), Metra, and Pace, which are called Service Boards in the RTA Act.   RTA serves Cook, DuPage, Kane, Lake, McHenry and Will counties.

The RTA Board consists of 16 directors, with 5 appointed by the Mayor of Chicago, 4 by the members of the Cook County Board elected outside of Chicago, one by the Cook County Board President, and one each by the County Board Chairman of the five collar counties. The Chairman of the RTA Board is the 16th member, and is appointed with the concurrence of 11 of the other RTA Board members, including at least 2 each from Chicago, suburban Cook County, and the collar counties, respectively. The chief executive officer is the executive director, who is appointed by the Chairman with the concurrence of 11 of the other directors.

The RTA system provides nearly 2 million rides per day, making it the third largest public transportation system in North America. The RTA provides several services to the public, including the RTA Travel Information line at 836-7000 from all Chicago area area codes, an automated trip planner, and "try transit" advertising.

The RTA has the authority to enter into agreements to provide service between points within the metropolitan region and outside of its territory, including into Indiana and Wisconsin.

History

1974 origin
RTA was created after a referendum in 1974.  In 1973, CTA had instituted its first major service cuts, and several suburban bus companies, including Evanston Bus Company and Glenview Bus Company had ceased operations, forcing Evanston to make arrangements with CTA and Wilmette to start a municipal service. The Rock Island and Milwaukee Road were already facing financial distresses, which would lead to their eventual bankruptcies, and the Illinois Central was petitioning the Interstate Commerce Commission to increase commuter fares, on the basis that the cost of operating its commuter train system was a burden on interstate commerce. While several suburbs had organized Mass Transit Districts to purchase equipment for the carriers with federal financial assistance, the Rock Island was still operating old equipment that it could not replace. In an attempt to deal with these problems in the six-county area, the RTA was established, with some taxing powers, to provide financial support through grants to the CTA and suburban mass transit districts, and purchase of service agreements with the private bus and rail operators.

1983 reorganization
In 1983, after a financial crisis, and the RTA taking over several private bus companies and the Rock Island and Milwaukee Road lines, the RTA Act was amended to create the Suburban Bus Division, now known as Pace, and  the Commuter Rail Division, now known as Metra. RTA's role then changed, so that it is now responsible for reviewing the operating and capital plans and expenditures of the Service Boards, developing an annual budget and program as well as a five-year plan, and distributing sales tax receipts to the Service Boards, in accordance with a statutory formula. However, RTA no longer provides service directly, as the Service Boards have the authority to determine the level, nature, and kind of public transportation to be provided,
 and to establish fares. Originally, RTA entered into purchase of service agreements with carriers, but the 1983 amendment gives the Service Boards the power to enter into those agreements with transportation agencies.

The 1983 legislation also imposed the requirements that the level of fares must be sufficient, in the aggregate, to equal 50 percent of the cost of providing transportation, and that the RTA Board inform each Service Board, as part of the budget process, of its required recovery ratio for the next fiscal year.

2004–2007 funding debate and 2008 legislation

Background
In 2004, the CTA, projecting a $55 million funding shortfall in its 2005 budget, called for a "long term funding solution," involving a change to the sales tax distribution formula in the RTA Act. In response, the Illinois General Assembly appropriated $54 million to cover the cost of CTA's paratransit service for 2005. An amendment to the RTA Act  made the RTA responsible for the funding, financial review and oversight of all ADA paratransit services, effective July 1, 2005, and transferred responsibility for operating or providing for the operation of paratransit service to Pace starting July 1, 2006, thereby relieving the CTA of that responsibility. The General Assembly also directed the Illinois Auditor General to audit the RTA and the Service Boards, as part of its review of the funding issue. The Auditor General's preliminary report, while agreeing that public funding was insufficient to support the level of transit services, said that the legislature must address other issues, including underfunded pensions, high salaries, absenteeism, and the lack of strong, centralized planning, resulting in several of the service boards competing for customers in the same areas, the Auditor General calling for "an end to the transit agencies fighting each other for customers, routes and federal funding for pet projects that may not fit into an overall regional transit plan."

The RTA approved 2007 Service Board budgets premised on the assumption that "a new funding source would be identified in 2007 to meet the funding requirements of [the] budget." Nonetheless, the CTA budget recognized, "Without this new funding source, CTA will be forced to cut service." With no legislative action by August, 2007, CTA and Pace announced proposals for service cuts, popularly known as "Doomsday Plans," to be implemented September 16. The September plans were postponed when the Governor proposed advancing 2008 state subsidies. A new Doomsday date was set for November 4, but that was avoided when the Governor engineered a transfer of capital funds. Again, the legislature having failed to pass a transit bill, the three service boards proposed 2008 budgets that assumed no new funding and postulated service cuts by CTA and Pace, and the deferral of capital projects by Metra, as well as fare increases by all three agencies.

The barriers to 2007 passage of a bill were the requirement that a 3/5ths supermajority of the legislators was needed to pass a bill after May 31 to be immediately effective, the Governor had threatened to veto a bill that included a sales tax increase, and many legislators tied a transit bill to a capital plan and a casino bill to fund that capital plan. However, with a new Doomsday deadline of January 20, 2008 approaching, the Governor called on the legislature to pass some bill, and he would "improve it," presumably using the amendatory veto. The Legislature passed HB656 on January 10, to which the Governor affixed an amendatory veto allowing senior citizens to ride all transit systems in the state for free. Although various media reports expressed concern that the legislation could not receive the votes to sustain it after it was returned with the amendment, the amendatory veto was accepted and the legislation passed on January 17, 2008.

Legislative response
The highlights of the 2008 amendments to the RTA Act include:
 The RTA sales tax was increased to 1.25% in Cook County, and 0.75% in the collar counties (from 1% and 0.25%, respectively), but one-third of the sales tax collected in the collar counties (i.e. 0.25%) is distributed directly to the counties and the county boards may use that money for transportation or public safety purposes.
 A new distribution of revenues is prescribed, essentially leaving the distribution of the sales taxes collected at the old rates as is (by references to "85% of 80% of the receipts from those taxes collected within the City of Chicago" and the like) and then, after certain funds described below are set aside, the remainder is allocated 48% to CTA, 39% to Metra and 13% to Pace.
 The Act requires that the RTA establish an Innovation, Coordination, and Enhancement Fund, an ADA Paratransit Fund, and a Suburban Community Mobility Fund.
 The Act calls for the implementation of an Interstate 55 bus rapid transit project and allocates money for programs to enhance access to job markets for residents in south suburban Cook County.
 Upon the vote of 9 Directors of the RTA, the Executive Director may intervene in a dispute among service boards or transportation agencies.
 On the vote of 12 Directors, the RTA may take over an alternatives analysis and preliminary environmental assessment of a project where multiple Service Boards or transportation agencies are potential service providers.
 The RTA must establish Disadvantaged Business Enterprise Contracting and Equal Employment Opportunity Programs.
 The RTA and Metra boards were reapportioned, effective April 1, 2008, with the most significant changes being that the chair of the CTA may no longer be on the RTA board, and the President of the Cook County Board was given an appointment to the RTA and Metra boards, respectively.
In addition, the legislation amended various other laws to deal with underfunding of the CTA Retirement Plan, and authorized the Chicago City Council to raise the real estate transfer tax for the sole benefit of the CTA, which it did.

Reform proposals
Since the 2008 changes, there have been several proposals to reform the region's transit agencies more dramatically.  In the wake of Metra's 2013 patronage scandal, state senators Daniel Biss and Terry Link introduced a bill to merge the RTA with the Chicago Metropolitan Agency for Planning.  At the same time, Governor Pat Quinn convened the Northeastern Illinois Public Transit Task Force to study potential reforms - this group concluded that Metra, the CTA, and Pace should be consolidated into one agency.  (Chicago mayor Rahm Emanuel opposed consolidation as reducing accountability to voters.)  In 2014, a report from the Organisation for Economic Co-operation and Development also recommended combining Metra, the CTA, and Pace to improve coordination.

See also
Unbuilt Rosemont personal rapid transit system

References

External links

 Regional Transportation Authority official website
 Illinois Auditor General: Mass Transit Agencies of Northeastern Illinois: RTA, CTA, Metra, and Pace – Performance Audit:
 Executive Summary
 Summary Report Digest
 Main Report

 
Chicago metropolitan area
Intermodal transportation authorities in Illinois
Transportation in Chicago
Transportation in Cook County, Illinois
Transportation in DuPage County, Illinois
Transportation in Kane County, Illinois
Transportation in Lake County, Illinois
Transportation in McHenry County, Illinois
Transportation in Will County, Illinois
1974 establishments in Illinois